The Roman Catholic Diocese of Armidale is  a suffragan Latin Rite diocese of the Archdiocese of Sydney, established in 1869 and covering the New England and Barwon River regions of New South Wales in Australia.

Saints Mary and Joseph Catholic Cathedral is the seat of the Catholic Bishop of Armidale, presently vacant after the Most Reverend Michael Kennedy was appointed to the Roman Catholic Diocese of Maitland-Newcastle.

History
Erected 28 November 1869. The first bishop, Timothy O'Mahony, was forced to resign over allegations of alcoholism and fathering a child, although he was eventually cleared by a church investigation.

Bishops
The following individuals have served as Roman Catholic Bishop of Armidale:
{| class="wikitable"
!Order
!Name
!Title
!Date installed
!Term ended
!Term of office
!Reason for term end
|-
|align="center"| || Timothy O'Mahony † ||Bishop of Armidale ||align="center"| 1869 ||align="center"| July 1877 ||align="right"|  years ||Resigned from Rome 
|-
|align="center"| || Elzear Torreggiani,  † ||Bishop of Armidale ||align="center"| November 1879 ||align="center"| January 1904 ||align="right"|  years ||Died in office
|-
|rowspan=2 align="center"| ||rowspan=2 |Patrick O'Connor †  ||Coadjutor Bishop of Armidale ||align="center"| May 1903 ||align="center"| January 1904 ||align="right"|  year ||Succeeded as Bishop of Armidale
|-
|Bishop of Armidale ||align="center"| January 1904 ||align="center"| July 1932 ||align="right"|  years ||Died in office
|-
|rowspan=2 align="center"| ||rowspan=2 | John Coleman †  ||Coadjutor Bishop of Armidale ||align="center"| September 1929 ||align="center"| July 1932 ||align="right"|  years ||Succeeded as Bishop of Armidale
|-
|Bishop of Armidale ||align="center"| July 1932 ||align="center"| December 1947 ||align="right"|  years || Died in office
|-
|align="center"| || Edward Doody † ||Bishop of Armidale ||align="center"|  ||align="center"|  ||align="right"|  || Died in office
|-
|align="center"| || James Darcy Freeman † ||Bishop of Armidale ||align="center"| December 1968 ||align="center"| 1971 ||align="right"|  years ||Elevated as Archbishop of Sydney 
|-
|align="center"| || Henry Kennedy † ||Bishop of Armidale ||align="center"| February 1972 ||align="center"|  ||align="right"|  years ||Retired 
|-
|align="center"| || Kevin Manning ||Bishop of Armidale ||align="center"|  ||align="center"|  ||align="right"|  ||Elevated as Bishop of Parramatta  
|-
|align="center"| || Luc Julian Matthys † ||Bishop of Armidale ||align="center"| March 1999 ||align="center"| December 2011 ||align="right"|  years || Retired as Emeritus Bishop of Armidale
|-
|align="center"| || Michael Kennedy ||Bishop of Armidale ||align="center"| February 2012 ||align="center"| February 2023 ||align="right"|  years || Appointed to Maitland–Newcastle.
|}

James Darcy Freeman was elevated to Cardinal in 1973, concurrent with Archbishop of Sydney.

Coadjutors are included above.

Other priests of the diocese who became bishops
Jeremiah Joseph Doyle, appointed Bishop of Grafton in 1887
John Steven Satterthwaite, appointed Coadjutor Bishop of Lismore in 1969
Gerard Joseph Hanna, appointed Bishop of Wagga Wagga in 2002

Cathedral

The diocesan cathedral is dedicated to Saint Mary and Saint Joseph and is located in Dangar Street, Armidale, opposite Armidale Central Park and diagonally opposite the Anglican cathedral. It was built in 1911 of Pyrmont stone and Armidale polychrome brick. It was solemnly dedicated on 12 December 1919.

Parishes
, there are currently 25 parishes located in Diocese of Armidale:

Armidale Cathedral

, administered by Barraba
, administered by Narrabri
, administered by Uralla

Sacred Heart, 

, administered by Moree
St Xavier, 
St Brigid, 
St Nicholas, 
St Edward, 
St Patrick, 

St Mary, 

St Andrew,

See also

Roman Catholicism in Australia

References

External links
Catholic Diocese of Armidale
Australian Catholic Bishops Conference: Diocese of Armidale 

 
Armidale
Armidale, Roman Catholic Diocese of
Armidale
Armidale
Armidale
Armidale